The 2019 season is PKNP FC's 4th competitive and 2nd consecutive season in the Malaysia Super League since being promoted from the Malaysia Premier League.

Players

Transfers

1st leg

In

Out

2nd leg

In

Out

Competitions

Malaysia Super League

Matches

League table

Malaysia FA Cup

Knockout phase

Malaysia Cup

Group stage

Squad statistics

Statistics accurate as of 3 August 2019.

References

Malaysian football clubs 2019 season